The Children's Court of Western Australia is a state court that hears cases involving children (aged 10 to 17 years) accused of committing criminal offences. It was originally called the Perth Children's Court when it was created in 1907 by the State Children's Act, but became known Children's Court of Western Australia when the Children's Court of Western Australia Act 1988 was passed.

The Perth Children's Court is located at 160 Pier Street, Perth, although children's court cases are heard in other courthouses throughout the state.

The current purpose-built Court building was constructed by Cooper & Oxley and officially opened on 9 June 1992. Previously the Court was housed in St George's Hall in Hay Street until it was re-located in 1977 to the former East Perth Primary School buildings.

References

Further reading 
 
 Geraldine, Byrne (July 1992) History of the Perth Children's Court. Law Society of Western Australia (pages 6–7)

Courthouses in Perth, Western Australia
Western Australian courts and tribunals
Children's courts in Australia
1907 establishments in Australia
Courts and tribunals established in 1907